Branchville is a borough in Sussex County, New Jersey, United States. As of the 2010 United States Census, the borough's population was 841, reflecting a decline of 4 (−0.5%) from the 845 counted in the 2000 Census, which had in turn declined by 6 (−0.7%) from the 851 counted in the 1990 Census. The borough is located in the northernmost region of Sussex County.

Branchville was incorporated as a borough by an act of the New Jersey Legislature on March 9, 1898, from portions of Frankford Township. An additional portion of Frankford Township was annexed as of March 1, 1951. The borough was named for its site at a branch of the Paulins Kill.

History

Branchville was established by settlers from Connecticut in the 18th century. It grew quickly and in the 1820s the town was divided into building lots. By the year 1844, it was a well-established community with 32 dwellings, mills, blacksmiths, an academy, a church and a variety of other factories and businesses.

The addition of two water-powered mills and a dam in 1855 furthered the town's prosperity. Energy would later be harnessed from this dam and a second one that was built to supply Branchville with electricity and its own power company.

Extension of rail service to Branchville in 1869 brought an even greater boon to the village's economic market growth. From 1869–1871 forty new homes were built. The railroad had made it possible to ship products from the local mills and creameries to larger urban areas to the east. With lake communities nearby the tourism was also spurred by the railroad. Up to six trains a day would bring people from the larger cities to enjoy a country vacation.

Geography
According to the United States Census Bureau, the borough had a total area of 0.60 square miles (1.55 km2), including 0.59 square miles (1.53 km2) of land and 0.01 square miles (0.02 km2) of water (1.17%).

Branchville is an independent municipality completely surrounded by Frankford Township, making it part of 21 pairs of "doughnut towns" in the state, where one municipality entirely surrounds another.

Climate
This climatic region is typified by large seasonal temperature differences, with warm to hot (and often humid) summers and cold (sometimes severely cold) winters.  According to the Köppen Climate Classification system, Branchville has a humid continental climate, abbreviated "Dfb" on climate maps.

Geology

Branchville is on the Ordovician Martinsburg Formation. This is a shale, slate, and limestone formation created 450 million years ago when a chain of volcanic islands collided with proto North America. The islands went over the North American Plate, creating the Highlands of Sussex County and the Kittatinny Valley. Millions of years of erosion occurred and there was a second event. About 400 million years ago a small continent that was long and thin, collided with proto North America creating folding and faulting. The Silurian Shawangunk conglomerate that was under a shallow sea, lifted due to pressure. The pressure created heat which melted the silica and bonded the quartz and conglomerate together, creating Kittatinny Mountain.

The Wisconsin Glacier covered all of Branchville from 21,000 BCE to 13,000 BCE, covering the top of Kittatinny Mountain. End moraines exist in Stokes State Forest, another just off Route 565 north of the Skylands Park and one about a mile south of Ross's Corner. An esker was created when the glacier retreated due to climate warming. Many ponds and lakes created. Culver Lake was created at this time, as the drainage became blocked. Branchville is drained by Culver's Lake Creek and Dry brook.  Dry Creek starts at the Branchville Reservoir, travels south, enters into Culver's Creek in Branchville and eventually empties into the Paulinskill. There is a chain of hills between Dry Creek and Papakatin Creek. These hills are what separate the Paulinskill River drainage system from that of the Wallkill. The drainage divide is just north of Route 206 and the goes northwest toward Branchville Reservoir. Water near Route 206 or south of Route 206 drains into the Paulinskill. Water north of Route 206 drains into the Wallkill River.

Demographics

Census 2010

The Census Bureau's 2006–2010 American Community Survey showed that (in 2010 inflation-adjusted dollars) median household income was $56,875 (with a margin of error of +/− $29,887) and the median family income was $84,643 (+/− $16,892). Males had a median income of $61,042 (+/− $20,432) versus $37,955 (+/− $6,402) for females. The per capita income for the borough was $30,851 (+/− $4,509). About 2.6% of families and 2.6% of the population were below the poverty line, including 4.8% of those under age 18 and 2.5% of those age 65 or over.

Census 2000

As of the 2000 United States Census there were 845 people, 354 households, and 225 families residing in the borough. The population density was 1,421.6 people per square mile (553.0/km2). There were 377 housing units at an average density of 634.3 per square mile (246.7/km2). The racial makeup of the borough was 100.00% White, 0.12% African American, 0.36% Native American, 0.36% Asian, 0.12% from other races, and 0.59% from two or more races. Hispanic or Latino of any race were 1.30% of the population.

There were 354 households, out of which 28.8% had children under the age of 18 living with them, 52.5% were married couples living together, 9.6% had a female householder with no husband present, and 36.4% were non-families. 32.2% of all households were made up of individuals, and 18.1% had someone living alone who was 65 years of age or older. The average household size was 2.37 and the average family size was 3.03.

In the borough the population was spread out, with 24.0% under the age of 18, 4.5% from 18 to 24, 26.4% from 25 to 44, 27.0% from 45 to 64, and 18.1% who were 65 years of age or older. The median age was 42 years. For every 100 females, there were 87.4 males. For every 100 females age 18 and over, there were 82.4 males.

The median income for a household in the borough was $45,855, and the median income for a family was $60,909. Males had a median income of $36,250 versus $27,159 for females. The per capita income for the borough was $22,748. About 4.2% of families and 4.4% of the population were below the poverty line, including 4.9% of those under age 18 and 6.2% of those age 65 or over.

Economy
Selective Insurance, a regional insurance holding company that provides property and casualty insurance products and insurance services, has its headquarters in Branchville.

Government

Local government
Branchville is governed under the Borough form of New Jersey municipal government, which is used in 218 municipalities (of the 564) statewide, making it the most common form of government in New Jersey. The governing body is comprised of the Mayor and the Borough Council, with all positions elected at-large on a partisan basis as part of the November general election. The Mayor is elected directly by the voters to a four-year term of office. The Borough Council is comprised of six members elected to serve three-year terms on a staggered basis, with two seats coming up for election each year in a three-year cycle. The Borough form of government used by Branchville is a "weak mayor / strong council" government in which council members act as the legislative body with the mayor presiding at meetings and voting only in the event of a tie. The mayor can veto ordinances subject to an override by a two-thirds majority vote of the council. The mayor makes committee and liaison assignments for council members, and most appointments are made by the mayor with the advice and consent of the council.

, the Mayor of Branchville Borough is Democrat Anthony Frato Sr., whose term of office ends December 31, 2023. Members of the Branchville Borough Council are Council President Richard N. VanStone (R, 2022), Beverley Bathgate (R, 2023), Russell Bellis Jr. (R, 2024), H. Lee Doremus (R, 2022), Troy C. Orr (R, 2024) and Mary C. Whitesell (D, 2023).

In January 2015, the Borough Council appointed Steven Schechner to serve the term expiring in December 2018 that had been held by Frank J. San Phillip, who was elected but did not take office due to personal reasons; Schechner will serve on an interim basis until the November 2016 general election, when voters will select a candidate to serve the two years remaining in the term of office.

Federal, state and county representation
Branchville is located in the 5th Congressional District and is part of New Jersey's 24th state legislative district.

 

Sussex County is governed by a Board of County Commissioners whose five members are elected at-large in partisan elections on a staggered basis, with either one or two seats coming up for election each year. At an annual reorganization meeting held in the beginning of January, the board selects a Commissioner Director and Deputy Director from among its members, with day-to-day supervision of the operation of the county delegated to a County Administrator. , Sussex County's Commissioners are 
Commissioner Director Anthony Fasano (R, Hopatcong, term as commissioner and as commissioner director ends December 31, 2022), 
Deputy Director Chris Carney (R, Frankford Township, term as commissioner ends 2024; term as deputy director ends 2022), 
Dawn Fantasia (R, Franklin, 2024), 
Jill Space (R, Wantage Township, 2022; appointed to serve an unexpired term) and 
Herbert Yardley (R, Stillwater Township, 2023). In May 2022, Jill Space was appointed to fill the seat expiring in December 2022 that had been held by Sylvia Petillo until she resigned from office.

Constitutional officers elected on a countywide basis are 
County Clerk Jeffrey M. Parrott (R, Wantage Township, 2026),
Sheriff Michael F. Strada (R, Hampton Township, 2022) and 
Surrogate Gary R. Chiusano (R, Frankford Township, 2023). The County Administrator is Gregory V. Poff II, whose appointment expires in 2025.

Politics
As of March 23, 2011, there were a total of 556 registered voters in Branchville, of which 75 (13.5% vs. 16.5% countywide) were registered as Democrats, 306 (55.0% vs. 39.3%) were registered as Republicans and 175 (31.5% vs. 44.1%) were registered as Unaffiliated. There were no voters registered to other parties. Among the borough's 2010 Census population, 66.1% (vs. 65.8% in Sussex County) were registered to vote, including 85.7% of those ages 18 and over (vs. 86.5% countywide).

In the 2012 presidential election, Republican Mitt Romney received 259 votes (61.4% vs. 59.4% countywide), ahead of Democrat Barack Obama with 156 votes (37.0% vs. 38.2%) and other candidates with 7 votes (1.7% vs. 2.1%), among the 422 ballots cast by the borough's 583 registered voters, for a turnout of 72.4% (vs. 68.3% in Sussex County). In the 2008 presidential election, Republican John McCain received 253 votes (60.4% vs. 59.2% countywide), ahead of Democrat Barack Obama with 159 votes (37.9% vs. 38.7%) and other candidates with 4 votes (1.0% vs. 1.5%), among the 419 ballots cast by the borough's 578 registered voters, for a turnout of 72.5% (vs. 76.9% in Sussex County). In the 2004 presidential election, Republican George W. Bush received 277 votes (65.5% vs. 63.9% countywide), ahead of Democrat John Kerry with 137 votes (32.4% vs. 34.4%) and other candidates with 7 votes (1.7% vs. 1.3%), among the 423 ballots cast by the borough's 546 registered voters, for a turnout of 77.5% (vs. 77.7% in the whole county).

In the 2013 gubernatorial election, Republican Chris Christie received 72.9% of the vote (191 cast), ahead of Democrat Barbara Buono with 24.4% (64 votes), and other candidates with 2.7% (7 votes), among the 265 ballots cast by the borough's 566 registered voters (3 ballots were spoiled), for a turnout of 46.8%. In the 2009 gubernatorial election, Republican Chris Christie received 199 votes (68.6% vs. 63.3% countywide), ahead of Democrat Jon Corzine with 55 votes (19.0% vs. 25.7%), Independent Chris Daggett with 32 votes (11.0% vs. 9.1%) and other candidates with 4 votes (1.4% vs. 1.3%), among the 290 ballots cast by the borough's 542 registered voters, yielding a 53.5% turnout (vs. 52.3% in the county).

Education

Students in public school for pre-kindergarten through eighth grade attend the Frankford Township School District, located in Branchville, as part of a sending/receiving relationship. As of the 2017–2018 school year, the district, comprised of one school, had an enrollment of 520 students and 58.3 classroom teachers (on an FTE basis), for a student–teacher ratio of 8.9:1.

For ninth through twelfth grades, public school students from Branchville attend High Point Regional High School. Also attending the school are students from Frankford Township, Lafayette Township, Montague Township, Sussex Borough and Wantage Township (where the school is located). As of the 2017–2018 school year, the high school had an enrollment of 917 students and 84.3 classroom teachers (on an FTE basis), for a student–teacher ratio of 10.9:1.

Transportation

U.S. Route 206 is the main highway serving Branchville. County Route 519 also traverses the borough.

Notable people

People who were born in, residents of, or otherwise closely associated with Branchville include:

 David Zabriskie (born 1986), retired amateur wrestler and current wrestling coach

References

External links

 Official borough website
 Sussex County webpage for Branchville Borough
 Frankford Township School District
 
 School Data for the Frankford Township School District, National Center for Education Statistics
 High Point Regional High School

 
1898 establishments in New Jersey
Borough form of New Jersey government
Boroughs in Sussex County, New Jersey
New Jersey District Factor Group none
Populated places established in 1898